Igor Omelchenko (born 12 February 1960) is a Georgian former backstroke swimmer. He competed in three events at the 1976 Summer Olympics representing the Soviet Union.

References

External links
 

1960 births
Living people
Male backstroke swimmers from Georgia (country)
Soviet male backstroke swimmers
Olympic swimmers of the Soviet Union
Swimmers at the 1976 Summer Olympics
Sportspeople from Batumi